Embarkation is the process of boarding or loading of a ship or aircraft.

Embarkation, embarkment or embark may also refer to:
 Embark (transit authority), the public transit authority of the Oklahoma City metropolitan area, Oklahoma, United States
 Embarked military force
 The Embark Initiative, an Irish cycle-2 and cycle-3 tertiary education research initiative of IRCSET
 Embarkation fee, an airport service charge
 Embarkation (John McNeil album), a 1978 jazz album by John McNeil
 Embark Veterinary, an American canine genomics and biotechnology company

See also
 Debark (disambiguation)
 Boarding (disambiguation)